The Academy of Classical Christian Studies (often called The Academy) is a private classical Christian school located in Oklahoma City, Oklahoma, offering grades PK - 12. The Academy is the only classical Christian day school in the Oklahoma City metro area.

The Academy was formed in 2013 as a merger between Providence Hall Classical Christian School and Veritas Classical Academy.

The Academy's statement of faith is rooted in the Nicene Creed and the school's faculty and students represent the whole spectrum of Christianity.

The school's main office campus is located at 1120 East Hefner Road in Oklahoma City. It has three different  locations throughout the metropolitan area to serve all grades. The Academy offers Grammar education in both traditional (5-day) and blended (2-day) options. Dialectic education includes 5-day and 3-day options, and Rhetoric offers traditional 5-day learning. Fr. Nathan Carr serves as Head of School.

Academy of Classical Christian Studies is a member of the Society of Classical Learning.

References

External links

The Oklahoman

2013 establishments in Oklahoma
Christian schools in Oklahoma
Classical Christian schools
Educational institutions established in 2013
Private high schools in Oklahoma
Private middle schools in Oklahoma
Schools in Oklahoma City